Imathia is one of the regional units of Greece. It is part of the region of Central Macedonia, within the geographic region of Macedonia. The capital of Imathia is the city of Veroia.

Administration

The regional unit Imathia is subdivided into 3 municipalities. These are (number as in the map in the infobox):
Alexandreia (2)
Naousa (3)
Veroia (1)

Prefecture
As a part of the 2011 Kallikratis government reform, the regional unit Imathia was created out of the former Imathia prefecture. The prefecture had the same territory as the present regional unit. At the same time, the municipalities were reorganised, according to the table below.

Provinces
The former prefecture of Imathia was subdivided into the following provinces:

Note: Provinces no longer hold any legal status in Greece since 2006.

Geography
The northeastern part of Imathia, along the lower course of the river Aliakmonas, is a vast agricultural plain known as Kampania or Roumlouki. The area is known for the production of fruit crops, such as peaches and strawberries. Much of the population lives in this plain, where the towns Alexandreia and Veroia are situated. Imathia has a short shoreline on the Thermaic Gulf, around the mouth of the Aliakmonas. The mountainous western part of Imathia is covered by the Vermio Mountains, reaching 2,052 metres near the city of Naousa. The Pierian Mountains reach into the southern part of Imathia, south of the Aliakmonas. The regional unit borders on Pieria to the south, Kozani to the west, Pella to the north and Thessaloniki to the east. Imathia has a mainly Mediterranean climate with warm, dry summers and mild, wet winters.

Transport

The railway from Thessaloniki to Florina and the important railway from Thessaloniki to Athens pass through Imathia, with main stations at Platy, Veroia and Alexandreia. The motorways A2 (Egnatia Odos) (Igoumenitsa - Ioannina - Veroia - Thessaloniki) and A1 (Athens - Lamia - Larissa - Thessaloniki) and the Greek National Roads EO1, EO4 and EO4a pass through Imathia. The Alexandreia Airport is a military airport.

History

Imathia was named after the historic region Emathia, which was used by several classical authors as a synonym for Bottiaea or even all of Macedon. Important ancient towns in the area of present Imathia were Aegae and Beroea. As a part of the Macedonia region, it was ruled by the kingdom of Macedonia, the Roman Empire, the Byzantine Empire and from early 15th century by the Ottoman Empire. In 1913, as a result of the Second Balkan War, it became part of Greece. During and after the Greco-Turkish War (1919–1922), several refugees from Turkey settled in Imathia. Initially part of the prefecture of Thessaloniki, Imathia became a prefecture in 1946, and Veroia was selected as its capital.

Media

Newspapers
Agrotikoi Orizontes
Elefthero Vima
Epikaira Imathias
Epta Imathias
Imerisia
Kerkida
Laos
Pliroforisi
Macedonika Nea

Culture

Museums
Wine and Vine Museum (Naoussa)
Archaeological Museum of Veroia
Byzantine Museum of Veroia
Folklore Museum of the Lyceum of Hellenic Women (Naoussa)

Sports clubs
Veria F.C. - Veroia
Pontioi Veria F.C. - Veroia
Naoussa F.C. - Naousa
Alexandria F.C. - Alexandria

See also
 Emathus
List of settlements in Imathia
Former toponyms in Imathia Prefecture

References

External links
 Asyrmato Mitropolitiko Dyktio Hmathias, The local wireless network
 Official website
 Veroia 11th Public School

 
Prefectures of Greece
Regional units of Central Macedonia